Xestia dilucida, the dull reddish dart or reddish heath dart, is a moth of the family Noctuidae. The species was first described by Herbert Knowles Morrison in 1875. It is found in the United States from southern Maine to northern Florida, west to central Ohio and eastern Texas.

The wingspan is about 36 mm. Adults are on wing from September to November. There is one generation per year.

The larvae have been recorded on Vaccinium species.

References

Pogue, Michael G. (2006). "The Noctuinae (Lepidoptera: Noctuidae) of Great Smoky Mountains National Park, U.S.A." Zootaxa. 1215: 1-95. .

"Xestia dilucida". Moths of Maryland. Retrieved March 24, 2020.

Xestia
Moths of North America
Moths described in 1875